Cyperus grossianus is a species of sedge that is native to parts of Brazil.

See also 
 List of Cyperus species

References 

grossianus
Plants described in 1972
Flora of Brazil